Year 1564 (MDLXIV) was a leap year starting on Saturday (link will display the full calendar) of the Julian calendar.

Events 
 January–June 
 January 26 – Livonian War – Battle of Ula: A Lithuanian surprise attack results in a decisive defeat of the numerically superior Russian forces.
 March 25 – Battle of Angol in Chile: Spanish Conquistador Lorenzo Bernal del Mercado defeats and kills the toqui Illangulién.
 June 22 – French settlers abandon Charlesfort, the first French attempt at colonizing what is now the United States, and establish Fort Caroline in Florida.

 July–December 
 July – English merchant Anthony Jenkinson returns to London from his second expedition to the Grand Duchy of Moscow, having gained a considerable extension of trading rights for the English Muscovy Company.
 September 4 – The Ronneby Bloodbath takes place in Ronneby, Denmark (now in Sweden). 
 September 10 – Battle of Kawanakajima in Japan: Takeda Shingen fights the forces of Uesugi Kenshin for the final time, to a draw.
 November 21 – Spanish Conquistador Miguel López de Legazpi sails from Mexico. Later, he will conquer the Philippine Islands, founding Manila.

 Date unknown 
 First recorded report of a 'rat king'.
 approx. date – Idris Alooma starts to rule the Kanem-Bornu Empire.
The first Scottish Psalter is published.

Births 

 January 1 – Šurhaci, Chinese prince (d. 1611)
 February 15 – Galileo Galilei, Italian astronomer and physicist (d. 1642)
 February 26 (baptized) – Christopher Marlowe, English dramatist and poet (d. 1593)
 March 7 – Pierre Coton, French Jesuit and royal confessor (d. 1626)
 March 9 – David Fabricius, Frisian astronomer (d. 1617)
 March 15 – William Augustus, Duke of Brunswick-Harburg (d. 1642)
 March 20 – Thomas Morton, English bishop (d. 1659)
 April 2 – William Bathe, Irish Jesuit priest (d. 1614)
 April 26 (baptized) – William Shakespeare, English dramatist and poet (d. 1616)
 April 27 – Henry Percy, 9th Earl of Northumberland (d. 1632)
 April 30 – Francis Hay, 9th Earl of Erroll, Scottish noble (d. 1631)
 May 27 – Margherita Gonzaga, Duchess of Ferrara, Italian noble, patron of the arts (d. 1618)
 June 11 – Joseph Heintz the Elder, Swiss artist (d. 1609)
 June 12 – John Casimir, Duke of Saxe-Coburg (d. 1633)
 June 28 – Cort Aslakssøn, Norwegian astronomer (d. 1624)
 July 6 – Johanna Sibylla of Hanau-Lichtenberg, Countess consort of Wied-Runkel and Isenburg (d. 1636)
 August 18 – Federico Borromeo, Cardinal Archbishop of Milan (d. 1631)
 August 24 – Patrick Forbes, bishop in the Church of Scotland (d. 1635)
 September 13 – Vincenzo Giustiniani, Italian banker and art collector (d. 1637)
 September 24 – William Adams, English navigator and samurai (d. 1620)
 September 25 – Magnus Brahe, Swedish noble (d. 1633)
 September 28 – Sibylla of Anhalt, Duchess consort of Württemberg (1593-1608). (d. 1614)
 October 15 – Henry Julius, Duke of Brunswick-Lüneburg (1589-1613) (d. 1613)
 October 26 – Hans Leo Hassler, German composer and organist (d. 1612)
 November 3 (baptized) – Francisco Pacheco, Spanish artist (d. 1644)
 November 11 – Martinus Smiglecius, Polish philosopher (d. 1618)
 November 22 – Henry Brooke, 11th Baron Cobham, English peer and traitor (d. 1618)
 November 24 – Joseph Gaultier de la Vallette, French astronomer (d. 1647)
 December 25 
 Johannes Buxtorf, German Calvinist theologian (d. 1629)
 Nicolaus Mulerius, Dutch astronomer and medical academic (d. 1630)
 December 31 – Ernest II, Duke of Brunswick-Lüneburg, German ruler (d. 1611)
 approximate date – Xue Susu, Chinese artist
 date unknown
Pieter Brueghel the Younger, Flemish painter (d. 1638)
Daniel Chamier, French minister of religion (d. 1621)
Kryštof Harant z Polžic a Bezdružic, Bohemian composer and Protestant rebel (d. 1621)
Pedro Páez, Spanish Jesuit missionary to Ethiopia (d. 1622)
Thomas Shirley, English privateer (d. c.1634)
 probable
 Henry Chettle, English dramatist (d. 1607)

Deaths 

 January 9 – Margaret Howard, Duchess of Norfolk (b. 1540)
 February 18 – Michelangelo, Italian artist, architect and sculptor (b. 1475)
 February 19 – Guillaume Morel, French classical scholar (b. 1505)
 March 27 – Lütfi Pasha, Albanian-born Ottoman statesman, juridical scholar and poet of slave origin (b. c.1488)
 April – Pierre Belon, French naturalist (b. 1517) 
 April 9 – Georg Hartmann, German instrument maker (b. 1489)
 May 2 – Cardinal Rodolfo Pio da Carpi, Italian humanist (b. 1500)
 May 27 – John Calvin, French Protestant reformer (b. 1509)
 June 24 – Rani Durgavati, Indian queen (b. 1524)
 July 23 – Eléanor de Roucy de Roye, French noble (b. 1535)
 July 25 – Ferdinand I, Holy Roman Emperor (b. 1503)
 July 31 – Luís de Velasco, Viceroy of New Spain (b. 1511)
 August 10 – Miyoshi Nagayoshi, Japanese samurai and daimyō (b. 1522)
 August 30 – Duchess Sabina of Bavaria (b. 1492)
 October 5 – Pierre de Manchicourt, Flemish composer
 October 6 – Guido Ascanio Sforza di Santa Fiora, Italian Catholic cardinal (b. 1518)
 October 15 – Andreas Vesalius, Flemish anatomist (b. 1514)
 October 18 – Johannes Acronius Frisius, German physician and mathematician (b. 1520)
 December 6 – Ambrosius Blarer, influential German reformer in southern Germany and north-eastern Switzerland (b. 1492)
 date unknown
 Isabella Losa, Spanish scholar  (b. 1491)
 Giovanni da Udine, Italian painter (b. 1487)
 Purandara Dasa, Indian musician (b. 1484)
Argula von Grumbach, German Protestant reformer (b. 1490)
 Charles Estienne, French anatomist (b. 1503)
 Isabella de Luna, Spanish-Italian courtesan
 Manus O'Donnell, Irish leader
 probable – Maurice Scève, French poet (b. 1500)

References